The Trews are a Canadian rock band from Antigonish, Nova Scotia, consisting of vocalist Colin MacDonald, guitarist John-Angus MacDonald, bassist Jack Syperek, and drummer Chris Gormley. The band is currently based in Hamilton, Ontario. From their formation in 1997 to 2016, The Trews were among the top 150 best-selling Canadian artists in Canada and among the top 40 selling Canadian bands in Canada.

History
The band started their career with the name One I'd Trouser, a line taken from a song in Monty Python's The Meaning of Life. They changed their name to Trouser and eventually The Trews. They released an EP as One I'd Trouser, and a second EP under the name The Trews.

In the early summer of 2002 the band entered Rocksearch, a high-profile contest that is held annually by CHTZ-FM, a St. Catharines (Southern Ontario) rock radio station. Winning the contest would prove to be their big break as they soon landed a recording contract with Bumstead Productions.

The release of their first full-length CD House of Ill Fame followed in 2003. Produced by Big Sugar's Gordie Johnson, the album contained the singles "Every Inambition", "Not Ready to Go", "Tired of Waiting", "Fleeting Trust" and "Confessions". "Not Ready to Go" hit number one on Canadian rock radio and was the most played song of 2004 in that format. The band was nominated as New Group of the Year at the 2004 Juno Awards and "Not Ready to Go" was nominated as Single of the Year in 2005. House Of Ill Fame has been certified gold in Canada. It was re-released with a bonus live album called The Live Cut which featured live versions of songs taken from the album.

The song "Hollis and Morris" on their first album, refers to an intersection in the city of Halifax and not an intersection in Antigonish as previously speculated. The band has mentioned during concerts and in interviews that the corner of Hollis and Morris is notorious for prostitution.

The band released a follow-up to House of Ill Fame on August 16, 2005. The album, Den of Thieves, was produced by legendary producer Jack Douglas (Aerosmith, Cheap Trick, John Lennon, New York Dolls). The first single, "So She's Leaving", was released to radio June 28, 2005 and was followed by the singles "Yearning", which was their second single to reach number 1, "Poor Ol' Broken Hearted Me", and "I Can't Say". In the summer of 2005 the band was invited to share the stage with the Rolling Stones at the Phoenix Concert Theatre in Toronto as part of the Stones' Bigger Bang Tour. In fall of the same year they were invited to open for Led Zeppelin singer Robert Plant on his cross-Canada arena tour. Den of Thieves was certified Canadian Gold in April 2006. The album was released 18 April 2006 in the United States on Red Ink and Sony BMG.

The Trews were nominated in the Best New Band category in Classic Rock magazine's 2007 Classic Rock Roll of Honour Awards. Issue #104 of the magazine (the April 2007 edition) also included a four-track promotional EP entitled Out of the Past, Into the Dark.

The Trews' third album, No Time for Later, was released in February 2008. The first single, "Hold Me in Your Arms", was made available on 25 November 2007. It premiered at the 2007 Grey Cup pre-game show and was immediately released on iTunes; the video for the song eventually went to number one on MuchMusic for a week in April 2008. In early 2009, "Hold Me in Your Arms" won in The 8th Annual Independent Music Awards (US) for Best Hard Rock/Metal Song. A bonus song called "Long Way from Freedom" was included with the single but was not released on the album. "Hold Me in Your Arms" went on to spend 22 weeks in the top ten at rock radio in Canada and in May 2010 was certified Canadian gold the commemorate the sales of over 20,000 digital downloads. In early February 2008, the band added keyboardist Jeff Heisholt to their live lineup. The second single from No Time for Later was "Paranoid Freak", the video for which was released in May and went straight into rotation on MuchMusic. The third single, a ballad called "Man Of Two Minds", was released September 8, 2008 and the video reached number one on MuchMusic sister station MuchMoreMusic. The fourth single, "Can't Stop Laughing", was sent to radio in January 2009 with a video that followed in April and became the band's tenth single to enter the top ten at Canadian rock radio. The band was nominated for two Juno Awards in 2009, Album of the Year (for No Time for Later) and Group of the Year.

No Time for Later was released in the United States on April 7, 2009, on Merovingian Music. The first single "Paranoid Freak" was sent to radio a few weeks prior to its release and was added in heavy rotation at Sirius Satellite Radio's Alt. Nation. The second single in the US was "Hold Me In Your Arms" and garnered significant play at Active Rock.

Their second live album, Acoustic - Friends & Total Strangers, released Oct. 6, 2009, was an acoustic session recorded over two nights at Toronto's Glenn Gould Studio in January 2009 for a live audience. It was released without any edits or overdubs and was produced by the band's guitarist John Angus MacDonald. There is also a 23-song DVD of the same name available which captures the second nights performance in its entirety as well as candid interviews with the band. The release earned the band their fifth Juno nomination for DVD of the year in 2010. The album's only single, "Sing Your Heart Out", a new song written specifically for the performances, won Best AAA/Alternative Song at the 2010 International Acoustic Music Awards (US).

Following Acoustic - Friends & Total Strangers the band released the single "Highway Of Heroes". It was inspired by the 2006 death of Capt. Nichola Goddard, the first Canadian female soldier killed in Afghanistan and a schoolmate of members of the Trews. It refers to the stretch of Highway 401 in Ontario, between CFB Trenton and downtown Toronto, where hundreds gather on bridges and overpasses to mourn soldiers killed in Afghanistan while the bodies of the fallen soldiers are transported from Trenton to the coroner's office in downtown Toronto. The song was made available on iTunes in Canada only, with all proceeds from the sales of the song going to the Canadian Hero Fund, a charity that provides academic scholarships to the spouses and children of soldiers killed in combat. In October 2014 "Highway of Heroes" was certified Gold in Canada for sales of over 40,000 digital downloads.

In November 2010, the band performed the Canadian National anthem at the 98th Grey Cup in Edmonton.

The band's fourth studio album, Hope & Ruin was released on April 12, 2011. The album was co-produced by John-Angus MacDonald and the Tragically Hip's Gord Sinclair and was recorded at the Hip's own Bathouse Studio in Bath, Ontario. The album was mixed by Canadian engineer/mixer Mike Fraser (AC/DC, Franz Ferdinand, Aerosmith, Mother Mother). The first single "Hope and Ruin" entered the top ten at Canadian rock radio within 3 weeks of its release. The video for Hope and Ruin received significant play on MuchMoreMusic. The second single and video from the album, "The World, I Know", received significant play and is the 12th single to enter the top 10 at rock radio in Canada. The third single from Hope and Ruin was "Misery Loves Company" which climbed to #6 on the rock charts making it the band's 13th top ten rock single. Hope & Ruin was released in Australia with first single "Hope & Ruin" receiving heavy airplay on Australian rock radio chain triple M; the band toured the continent three times during the album cycle. Hope & Ruin was also released in the United Kingdom, with "The World, I Know" acknowledged in the Top Songs of 2011 by Classic Rock Magazine. The band toured the UK and the USA heavily during this time. In August 2012 the band supported Bruce Springsteen at Magnetic Hill outside of Moncton, New Brunswick. They were invited by Bruce to join him in his encore for a 10-minute rendition of "Twist and Shout".

On November 6, 2012 the band issued a 7-song EP entitled ...Thank You and I'm Sorry. Co-produced by John-Angus MacDonald and Gordie Johnson, the EP features guest appearances by The Black Crowes' Rich Robinson as well as ex-Black Crowes Eddie Harsch. Ian McLagan of The Small Faces and the Faces also makes an appearance. The EP's first single "The Power of Positive Drinking" received extensive airplay across Canada reaching number 1 on the CBC rock chart the week of December 7, 2012.

In April 2014 the band released its 5th full-length studio album eponymously titled The Trews. It was the band's highest charting debut to date reaching #1 on the Rock, Alternative and Independent Album Charts and #3 on the overall chart in Canada. The album's first single "What's Fair is Fair" reached #2 on the Canadian Active Rock radio chart and its video received heavy play on MUCH, MUCHMORE and MUCH LOUD. The album's second and third singles "Rise in the Wake" & "New King" also reached the top ten at Canadian Rock Radio bringing the total to 16 top ten Active Rock hits. In the August 2014 edition of the UK's Classic Rock Magazine (issue #201), 90,000 copies of "The Trews" were distributed free with the magazine; the issue featured Slash on its cover. In September 2014 the band took part in the first ever CapeFest in Sydney, Cape Breton, Nova Scotia along with Slash and Aerosmith.

In September 2016 the band released "Time Capsule", a 20-song album that included 16 of their greatest hits as well as 4 brand new recordings. The album's first single "Beautiful & Tragic" peaked in the top 5 on Canadian Rock Radio and became the band's 17th top ten rock radio single of their career. In support of the album they launched a Canadian tour in the fall of 2016 and joined Weezer on tour in the spring of 2017.

On March 16, 2018 the band released "the New US" to radio as the first single from their forthcoming album. The song stirred up some controversy with its political lyrics that took aim at the madness of Trump's America. A second radio single, "Vintage Love", was released on June 22 and became the band's 18th single to chart top ten at active rock radio in Canada. A bonus track from the album entitled "Bar Star" was also released on July 29.  The album, entitled 'Civilianaires', was released on September 14, 2018 to great critical and commercial success. It debuted number 1 on the Alternative Album charts in Canada, number 3 on the Digital Current chart and number 6 over all on the Current Album Chart. The band announced that they would be supporting the album with tours in the states in the fall of 2018 and Canada in early 2019. 'Civilianaires' was nominated Rock Album of the Year at the 2019 Juno awards. This was the band's sixth Juno nomination to date.

In September 2019, with no announcements or fanfare, the Trews released “Touch”, a song they had recorded earlier that spring with 'Civilianaires' producer Derek Hoffman. The video was shot in one day and was directed by John-Angus MacDonald; it's a single-shot from beginning to end, only their second video to be shot in this format. The second song from that session, “God Speed Rebel”, was released in April 2020 during the global COVID-19 pandemic. The band recorded the video using Zoom video chatting technology, one of the first groups to do so, and all proceeds from the song, including views on YouTube and streams on Spotify and Apple Music, go to the Unison Benevolent fund, a Canadian arts charity that supports musicians and those in the music industry in times of emergency. The band also canvassed for videos from their fans of them lip-syncing along with the song, and created another version of the video that was released with the title “Stay Home Rebel”.

In April 2021, the Trews released the single "I Wanna Play," a song inspired partly by the COVID-19 pandemic. The music video featured an appearance by photographer and musician Bob Lanois and was filmed shortly before his sudden death.

Dalton's departure
On 14 July 2015, drummer Sean Dalton stepped down from the band sending this message to fans via email:

"To all the hard core Trewbadours out there: Well what can I say folks its been an amazing run. The years playing with the Trews have been best years of my life. Countless hours in the jam space and playing thousands of live shows all over the world have shaped me as a musician, and playing with such great guys has made me a better human being. I will miss it very much.

Due to unforeseen circumstances, I've decided to step down from the drum throne. Nothing weird goin' on here folks...just time to do what's best for me and the family. I wish the Trews nothing but the best, and was so fortunate to play with the best friggin' band in the country. I'll be hanging with you all in the crowd at the next show."

Gavin Maguire took over as the band's drummer. In March 2018, Chris Gormley replaced Gavin Maguire as the band's drummer.

Discography

Studio albums

Compilations

EPs

Live albums

Video albums

Singles

Featured singles

Band members

Current
 Colin MacDonald - rhythm guitar, lead vocals (1996–present)
John-Angus MacDonald - lead guitar, backing vocals (1996–present)
 Jack Syperek - bass guitar, backing vocals (1996–present)
 Chris Gormley - drums (May 13, 2018 – present)

Touring
  Jeff Heisholt - keyboards, backing vocals (2008–present)

Past

 Rose Murphy - drums (1996)
 Ramsey Clark - drums (1997-2001)
 Sean Dalton - drums, backing vocals (2001-2015)
 Gavin Maguire - drums (2015-2018)

Timeline

Nominations and awards

Juno Awards
 2004: New Group of the Year – Nominated
 2005: Single of the Year ("Not Ready to Go") – Nominated
 2009: Group of the Year – Nominated
 2009: Rock Album of the Year (No Time for Later) – Nominated
 2010: DVD of the Year "Acoustic: Friends and Total Strangers" – Nominated
 2019: Rock Album of the Year (Civilianaires)  - Nominated

East Coast Music Awards (ECMA)
 2005: Group of the Year – Won
 2006: Video of the Year (So She's Leaving – Director: Stephen Scott) – Won
 2011: DVD of the Year (The Trews Acoustic – Friends & Total Strangers – Director: Tim Martin) – Won
 2011: Fan's Choice Video of the Year (Highway of Heroes – Director: Tim Martin) – Won
 2012: Fan's Choice Entertainer Of The Year - Nominated
 2012: Fan's Choice Video Of The Year ("Hope & Ruin") - Nominated
 2012: Group Recording Of The Year ("Hope & Ruin") - Nominated
 2012: Song Of The Year ("Hope & Ruin") - Nominated
 2012: Rock Recording Of The Year ("Hope & Ruin") - Won
 2013: Fan's Choice Entertainer Of The Year - Nominated
 2014: Fan's Choice Entertainer Of The Year - Nominated
 2014: Group Recording Of The Year ("...Thank You & I'm Sorry") - Nominated
 2014: Rock Recording Of The Year ("...Thank You & I'm Sorry") - Won
 2015: Group Recording Of The Year ("The Trews") - Nominated
 2015: Rock Recording Of The Year ("The Trews") - Won
 2015: Fan's Choice Entertainer Of The Year - Nominated
 2015: Fan's Choice Video Of The Year (What's Fair is Fair -Director: Drew Lightfoot) - Nominated

Independent Music Awards (US)
 2008: Best Hard Rock Song ("Hold Me in Your Arms") – Won
 2009: Vox Pop best Concert Photo taken by Nancy Desrosiers
 2010: Best AAA/Alternative Song International Acoustic Music Awards (US) "Sing Your Heart Out" - Won
 2012: Rock Artists / Group Or Duo Of The Year - Nominated

See also

Canadian rock
Music of Canada

References

External links
 The Trews official website
 The Trews YouTube
 
 "Highway of Heroes", a featured article on Duty & Valour

 
Musical groups established in 1997
Musical groups from Nova Scotia
Antigonish, Nova Scotia
Canadian alternative rock groups
Independent Music Awards winners
Nettwerk Music Group artists